Round About Midnight at the Cafe Bohemia is a live album by American jazz trumpeter Kenny Dorham. The album was recorded in 1956 at the Café Bohemia and released in 1957 on the Blue Note label. The original release featured 6 tracks; another 11 tracks, including some alternate takes was released in 1984 on the Japanese Blue Note label, as BNJ 61003/61004. A complete edition was released as a double-CD set in 2002.

Reception

The Allmusic review awarded the album 4 stars and stated: "This music is designed for relaxing and grooving out. It will greatly assist anyone who is traveling by night or trying to make it through to the end of another day".  The Penguin Guide to Jazz has selected this album as part of its suggested Core Collection, and gives the album a four-star rating (of a possible four).

Track listing

Personnel
Kenny Dorham – trumpet
J. R. Monterose – tenor saxophone (tracks 1, 3–7, 9–12 & 14–17)
Bobby Timmons – piano
Kenny Burrell – guitar (tracks 5–7, 9, 10 & 12–17)
Sam Jones – bass 
Arthur Edgehill – drums

References 

Blue Note Records live albums
Kenny Dorham live albums
1957 live albums
Albums recorded at the Café Bohemia
Albums produced by Alfred Lion